Kanpeki Gū no ne is a song from the anime series Fairy Tail. It was performed by Watarirouka Hashiritai 7. The song was played at the end of episodes 1-11 of the show’s first season.

References 

Anime songs
Fairy Tail